The 1989 Pacific-10 Conference men's basketball tournament was played March 9–12 at the Great Western Forum in Inglewood, California.  Like the previous year, both top seeds advanced to the final; Stanford made its first appearance in the title 
game and met the top-seeded (and top-ranked) Wildcats. Comfortably repeating as champion of the tournament was Arizona, which received the Pac-10's automatic bid to the NCAA tournament. Repeating as the Most Outstanding Player was Sean Elliott of Arizona.

This was the tournament's third edition and all ten teams participated.

Bracket

There were no overtime games

Tournament Notes
 Arizona was ranked #1 in the nation entering the tournament.
 For the 3rd year in a row, no universities played their arch-rival in the tournament.
 70 field goals were scored in a game by Arizona (37) and OSU (33). This is still the record number of FGs by both teams in a game for this tournament.
 Arizona had 23 assists in the game vs. OSU (a current record).
 USC upset 7 seed ASU to finally win a Pac-10 Tournament game after 3 tries. They became the 10th team to get a tournament win in its history.
 Arizona, UCLA, Oregon State, and Stanford all were invited to the 1989 NCAA Division I men's basketball tournament. 

 California was invited to the 1989 National Invitation Tournament.

All tournament team
Sean Elliott, Arizona
Jud Buechler, Arizona
Anthony Cook, Arizona
Todd Lichti, Stanford
Gary Payton, Oregon State

References

Tournament
Pac-12 Conference men's basketball tournament